James Allen Hoyt (born September 30, 1986) is an American professional baseball pitcher who is a free agent. He has played in Major League Baseball (MLB) for the Houston Astros, Cleveland Indians, Miami Marlins and Los Angeles Angels.

Career

Yuma Scorpions
After graduating from Boise High School, Hoyt played college baseball  at Palomar College before transferring to Centenary College of Louisiana. In 2011, he signed with the Yuma Scorpions of the North American League (NABL) after a tryout with the team. The 2011 Yuma Scorpions included former and future major league players such as Willy Aybar, Chris Britton, Joey Gathright, Luis Ugueto, Tony Phillips, Robby Scott, Franklyn Gracesqui, Ozzie Canseco and Jose Canseco, who served as the team's manager as well as a player for the club.

Edinburg Roadrunners
After the Scorpions folded, he went on to pitch for the Edinburg Roadrunners of the North Atlantic Baseball League. In 12 games for Edinburg, Hoyt pitched to a 1.04 ERA with 19 strikeouts in 17.1 innings pitched.

Wichita Wingnuts/Olmecas de Tabasco
Hoyt then signed with the Wichita Wingnuts of the American Association. On June 30, 2012, Hoyt signed with the Olmecas de Tabasco of the Mexican League. In 11 games for Tabasco, Hoyt notched a 2.03 ERA with 20 strikeouts in 13.1 innings pitched in 11 games. Hoyt returned to Wichita in August 2012 and finished the season with the club. Pitching for Wichita, Hoyt pitched to a 2.61 ERA with 15 strikeouts in 10.1 innings pitched over 11 appearances.

Atlanta Braves
While pitching for Tabasco, Hoyt impressed Atlanta Braves scouts and they signed him to a minor league contract on November 15, 2012.

Hoyt started his career in the Braves organization with the Lynchburg Hillcats of the Class A-Advanced Carolina League in 2013. He was later promoted to the Mississippi Braves of the Class AA Southern League. Hoyt started 2014 back with Mississippi and in June he was promoted to the Gwinnett Braves of the Class AAA International League.

Houston Astros
On January 14, 2015, Hoyt along with Evan Gattis was traded to the Houston Astros for Rio Ruiz, Andrew Thurman, and Mike Foltynewicz.

On August 2, 2016, the Astros promoted Hoyt to the major leagues.

On March 31, 2017, he was optioned to the Fresno Grizzlies of the Class AAA Pacific Coast League. On April 20, 2017, the Astros promoted Hoyt to the major leagues. Hoyt made 32 appearances out of the bullpen for the Astros in 2017, finishing with a 1–0 record and a 4.38 ERA. The Astros finished the season with a 101–61 record for an AL West pennant, and eventually won the 2017 World Series. Hoyt did not participate in the playoff run, but was still on the team's 40-man roster at the time, declaring him eligible for his first career World Series title.

Cleveland Indians
On July 6, 2018, Hoyt was traded to the Cleveland Indians for minor league righthanded pitcher Tommy DeJuneas.

The Indians declined to tender Hoyt a major league contract for the 2019 season by the November 30, 2018 deadline, making Hoyt a free agent. The Indians re-signed Hoyt to a minor league contract on December 1, 2018. On September 1, 2019, the Indians selected Hoyt's contract. Hoyt was designated for assignment on December 2, 2019. On December 4, Hoyt re-signed with Cleveland on a major league contract. The Indians designated Hoyt for assignment on July 28, 2020.

Miami Marlins
Hoyt was traded by the Indians to the Miami Marlins on August 1, 2020, in exchange for cash considerations. In the pandemic shortened season, Hoyt pitched to a 1.23 ERA with 20 strikeouts and only 2 earned runs on 9 hits in 14.2 innings pitched across 24 games.

Los Angeles Angels
On March 29, 2021, Hoyt was traded to the Los Angeles Angels in exchange for cash considerations. Hoyt registered a 6.75 ERA in 9 appearances with the Angels in 2021. On October 22, 2021, Hoyt was outrighted off of the 40-man roster. He elected free agency on November 7.

References

External links

1986 births
Living people
American expatriate baseball players in Mexico
Baseball players from Idaho
Cardenales de Lara players
American expatriate baseball players in Venezuela
Centenary Gentlemen baseball players
Cleveland Indians players
Columbus Clippers players
Edinburg Roadrunners players
Fresno Grizzlies players
Gigantes del Cibao players
Gwinnett Braves players
Houston Astros players
Los Angeles Angels players
Lynchburg Hillcats players
Major League Baseball pitchers
Mexican League baseball pitchers
Miami Marlins players
Mississippi Braves players
Olmecas de Tabasco players
Palomar Comets baseball players
Salt Lake Bees players
Sportspeople from Boise, Idaho
Toros del Este players
American expatriate baseball players in the Dominican Republic
Wichita Wingnuts players
Yuma Scorpions players